J. Paul McGrath (September 9, 1940 – July 9, 2013) was an American attorney who served as the United States Assistant Attorney General for the Civil Division from 1981 to 1983 and as the United States Assistant Attorney General for the Antitrust Division from 1983 to 1985.

He died on July 9, 2013, in Montclair, New Jersey at age 72.

References

1940 births
2013 deaths
United States Assistant Attorneys General for the Antitrust Division
United States Assistant Attorneys General for the Civil Division